is a musical duo from Japan.

Members
Manami (愛未) was born  on December 28, 1986 in Osaka, Japan.  She is responsible for vocals and songwriting.  She debuted as a solo artist in 2008 under the stage name "Aimmy". Her debut single, reached #186 on the Oricon charts.

Yoshiaki Dewa , born in Osaka on February 26, 1984, handles programming, composition and arrangement.

Discography

Maxi singles

Albums

Anime series
Their song Anata ga Ita Mori, first track of their album Wild Flower is the ending song of episodes 01 to 13 and 15 to 23 of the anime adaptation of the Type-Moon visual novel Fate/Stay night.  The third track, Hikari, is the ending of the 14th episode of the same series.  The second track of the same album, Koibito Doushi, is the ending song of the episodes 12 to 24 of Aa Megami-sama: Sorezore no Tsubasa (Ah! My Goddess: Flights of fancy).  Also, the seventh track, Hoshi Akari, is the ending song of the anime series Busou Renkin.

External links
Jyukai's Official Website

References

Japanese pop music groups
Japanese musical duos
Musical groups from Osaka
Anime musicians